Richard Barrett Davis  (1782–1854) was an animal and landscape painter.

Davis was born at Watford in 1782. He studied under William Evans of Eton, under William Beechey, and in the schools of the Royal Academy, where he first exhibited in 1802. He joined the Society of British Artists in 1829, and was appointed animal painter to William IV in 1831. He died in 1854. Amongst his works are:

Mares and Foals from the Royal Stud, 1808
Going to Market, 1814
Horse Fair, 1821
Travellers attacked by Wolves, 1831
Near Virginia Water (South Kensington Museum)

References

Attribution:

External links

1782 births
1854 deaths
19th-century English painters
English male painters
People from Watford
Court painters
Equine artists
Members of the Royal Society of British Artists
19th-century English male artists